Joji (じょうじ, 丈二, or 譲二, 城二, 譲治 multiple variants) is a Japanese masculine given name. It is also the Japanese pronunciation of the Western name "George" (ジョージ).

It commonly refers to:
 Jōji, an era in Japanese history
 Joji (musician), stage name of musician and former Internet personality George Miller

Joji, Jouji or Jōji may also refer to:

People with the name
 Marampudi Joji (1942–2010), Archbishop of Hyderabad
  (born 1943), Japanese manga artist
, pseudonym of Japanese manga storywriter, novelist and screenwriter Shin Kibayashi
 Joji Banuve (1940–2009), Fijian politician
, Japanese photographer
, Japanese violinist and conductor
, Japanese film and television director
, Japanese ice hockey player
 Jōji Jonokuchi, pseudonym of writer Kiyohiko Azuma 
, Japanese author
, Japanese speedskater
 Joji Kotobalavu, Fiji civil servant
, Japanese manga artist
, legal scholar, politician and cabinet minister in the pre-war Empire of Japan
, Japanese film director
, Japanese manga artist
, Japanese-German automobile designer for BMW
, Japanese voice actor who is affiliated with the Office Osawa agency
, Japanese-Korean criminal
, Japanese cinematographer
, Japanese model and actor
 Joji Takami, 15 year-old victim in the 2004 Ōmuta murders
, Japanese professional basketball player
, birth name of special effects artist, film director, and former musician, Screaming Mad George
, Japanese voice actor
, Japanese composer of contemporary classical music

Film
 Joji (film), a 2021 Malayalam-language film

Japanese masculine given names